Paul Wolschoefer is a male former French international table tennis player.

He won a bronze medal at the 1936 World Table Tennis Championships in the Swaythling Cup (men's team event) with Raoul Bedoc, Michel Haguenauer, Charles Dubouillé and Daniel Guérin for France.

See also
 List of table tennis players
 List of World Table Tennis Championships medalists

References

French male table tennis players
World Table Tennis Championships medalists